Paul McShane (born 19 November 1989) is an English professional rugby league footballer who plays as a  or  for the Castleford Tigers (Heritage № 961) in the Super League and England at international level. He is the captain of Castleford.

He has previously played for the Leeds Rhinos, and on loan from Leeds at Hull F.C., Widnes Vikings and the Hunslet Hawks. He spent two seasons at the Wakefield Trinity Wildcats before joining Castleford in 2015. He was named Man of Steel for the 2020 season.

Background
McShane was born in Leeds, West Yorkshire, England.

Club career

Leeds Rhinos
McShane was captain of Merlyn Rees High School team. He joined the Leeds Academy from Hunslet Hawks in 2006. He was named Junior Academy Player of the Year in 2007 & kicked five goals in their Grand Final win over St. Helens.

McShane was named in the England U18 Academy squad to tour Australia in June 2008.

McShane signed a five-year contract with Leeds in July 2008, keeping him at the club until at least 2013. 

He made his first team début on the opening day of the 2009 Super League season against Crusaders at Headingley. He made two further appearances in 2009, including his first start against Warrington Wolves.

McShane was a replacement in the Leeds side that won the 2012 World Club Challenge, beating Manly-Warringah 26-12.

Hull FC (loan)
In April 2010, McShane signed for Hull F.C. on a one-month loan deal. He made 4 appearances for the club. McShane made a further 9 Super League appearances for Leeds in 2010. He also scored his first try, against Harlequins RL.

Widnes Vikings (loan)
In May 2012, Widnes Vikings signed McShane on a loan deal for the rest of the season. McShane made 11 appearances during this period, scoring 3 tries and kicking 4 goals.

Hunslet Hawks (loan)
McShane played for the Hunslet Hawks on loan during 2013.

Return to Leeds Rhinos

In 2013, McShane made 23 appearances for Leeds. However, at the end of the season, Leeds agreed to release McShane from his contract and placed him on the transfer list.

Wakefield Trinity Wildcats
McShane was signed by Wakefield Trinity Wildcats in November 2013.

Castleford Tigers
In July 2015, McShane joined Castleford on a two-and-a-half-year contract as part of a deal that saw Scott Moore move the other way on loan. He made his club debut against Hull F.C. in the first game of the Super 8s.

McShane was ever-present for Castleford in the 2016 season, appearing in every game. He was an integral part of the 2017 squad that won the League Leaders' Shield and he played in the 2017 Super League Grand Final defeat by Leeds at Old Trafford. He was named Castleford Tigers' 3rd Place 2017 Player of the Year.

In January 2018, it was announced that McShane had signed a new five-year deal with the Tigers. McShane had an outstanding personal season for Castleford in 2018. He dominated the club's end-of-season awards, being recognised as the Fans' Player of the Year, Directors' Player of the Year, Players' Player of the Year, and 1st Place Player of the Year.

Despite disruption due to injuries within Castleford's squad and the Covid-19 pandemic, McShane appeared in every game in 2020. In November, McShane was voted Super League's 2020 Man of Steel - Castleford head coach Daryl Powell said, "He is one of the best nines in the game bar none and his all-round game is fantastic." He became the first player since 2011 to win the award with his team failing to qualify for the play-offs.

McShane signed a new three-year deal with Castleford in July 2021, extending his contract to the end of 2025. On 17 July 2021, he played for Castleford in their 2021 Challenge Cup Final loss against St. Helens. In recognition of his continued outstanding form, McShane was named Directors' Player of the Year and won the Immortals Award, voted for by Castleford legends, at the club's 2021 end-of-season awards.

Following the retirement of Michael Shenton, McShane was named as the new Castleford captain in January 2022.

International career 
McShane was first named in England's elite performance squad in May 2017.

McShane was named in Shaun Wane's first England squad in March 2020, in preparation for the end-of-season Ashes series. However, the series was later cancelled due to the Covid-19 pandemic.

McShane earned his first senior England cap against the Combined Nations All Stars on 25 June 2021 at the Halliwell Jones Stadium. He represented England in their 30-10 victory over France at the Stade Gilbert Brutus on 23 October 2021.

Club statistics

(* denotes season still competing)

References

External links

Castleford Tigers profile
Leeds Rhinos profile
SL profile
Josh Griffin and Paul McShane join new faces in Shaun Wane's first England squad

1989 births
Living people
Castleford Tigers captains
Castleford Tigers players
English rugby league players
Hull F.C. players
Hunslet R.L.F.C. players
Leeds Rhinos players
Rugby league halfbacks
Rugby league hookers
Rugby league players from Leeds
Wakefield Trinity players
Widnes Vikings players